

Events

January events 
 January – Opening throughout of first railroad in Africa and the Middle East, from Alexandria to Cairo, Egypt.
 January 29 – The 223-mile North Carolina Railroad is completed from Goldsboro through Raleigh and Salisbury to Charlotte.

March events 
 March 23 or 26 – Cambridge Railroad street railway opens in Boston (United States), giving the city the world's oldest continuously working streetcar system.

April events 
 April 19 – Death of American locomotive builder Thomas Rogers, following which his son, Jacob S. Rogers, reorganizes Rogers, Ketchum and Grosvenor as Rogers Locomotive and Machine Works.
 April 21 – The first railroad bridge across the Mississippi River opens between Rock Island, Illinois, and Davenport, Iowa.

May events 
 May 1 – First section of Bombay, Baroda and Central India Railway opens, between Ankleshwar and Utran.
 May 6 – The newly constructed sidewheeler Effie Afton runs into one of the supports for the first railroad bridge across the Mississippi River, causing a fire that destroys the bridge just two weeks after it had opened.

June events 
 June 21 – The Illinois Central Railroad opens its Great Central Station in Chicago.

July events 
 July 14 – The Rome and Frascati Rail Road opens for service.
 July 17 – The Great Train Wreck (the worst railroad calamity in the world up to this date) occurs near Philadelphia in the United States.

September events 
 September 16 – Tarragona–Reus line in Spain opens.
 September 21 – The Illinois Central Railroad connects Chicago to Cairo, Illinois, completing 700 miles (1,126 km) of track to become the longest railway in the United States.
 September 22 – The Oriental Railway Company is granted the concession to build the first railway in Turkey, from İzmir to Aydın.

October events 
 October 23 – The line that is now Belgian railway line 161 is completed and opened connecting Brussels-North and Namur stations.
 October 28 – Opening of first railway in Portugal, from Lisbon to Carregado.

December events 
 December 1 – Opening of first steam-operated passenger railways in Sweden, from Gothenburg to Jonsered and Malmö to Lund.

Accidents

Births

February births
 February 2 – Frederick William Vanderbilt, director of the New York Central system (d. 1938).

December births
 December 30 – Sam Fay, General manager of the Great Central Railway of England, 1902–1922 (d. 1953).

Deaths

January deaths
January 8 – Charles "Joe" Baldwin, conductor on the Wilmington and Manchester Railroad

March deaths
 March 11 – James Beatty, Irish engineer who was involved in building the European and North American Railway and the Grand Crimean Central Railway (b. 1820).

April deaths
 April 19 – Thomas Rogers, American steam locomotive builder, dies in New York (b. 1792).
 April 20 – Robert L. Stevens, president of Camden and Amboy Railroad (b. 1787).

November deaths
 November 1 - John Urpeth Rastrick, English steam locomotive builder and partner in Foster, Rastrick and Company (b. 1780).

References
 Brief biographies of major mechanical engineers. Retrieved February 9, 2005.
 Rivanna Chapter National Railway Historical Society (2005), This month in railroad history: September. Retrieved September 21, 2005.